Archibald Marshall Bell (born September 28, 1942) is an American character actor. He has appeared in many character roles in movies and television. He is known for roles in A Nightmare on Elm Street 2: Freddy's Revenge (1985), Stand by Me (1986), Twins (1988), Total Recall (1990) and Starship Troopers (1997).

Early life and education

Bell was born in Tulsa, Oklahoma, where he lived until age 13. His family then moved to Denver, Colorado. Bell attended boarding school at St. Paul's, Concord, New Hampshire, but was expelled. He then went to Fountain Valley School in Colorado Springs, where he became interested in acting after performing as Elwood Dowd in the play Harvey.

Bell was discouraged by others, however, who told him he was not a good enough actor, and did not act again for over 20 years. He attended the University of Colorado, majoring in sociology, and served three years in the Army. He eventually became a consultant, teaching business executives to improve their speaking skills.

Career

Bell's movie debut was in the role as Ronsky in Alan Parker's drama Birdy (1984). After Birdy, he played Gerry Jones in the Fred Roos comedy Seven Minutes in Heaven (1985). His first major role was as the cruel Coach Schneider in the slasher/horror A Nightmare on Elm Street 2: Freddy's Revenge (1985). Bell played Mr. Lachance, Gordie's grieving father, in the adventure/drama Stand by Me (1986); the ruthless hitman, Webster, in the comedy Twins (1988) starring Arnold Schwarzenegger and Danny DeVito; and George, who has mutant Martian resistance leader, Kuato, attached to his stomach, in director Paul Verhoeven's blockbuster science fiction/adventure Total Recall (1990) starring Schwarzenegger.

He made his TV acting debut in the series The Oldest Rookie in 1987, playing Det. Gordon Lane. Bell starred as Ford Plasko in the short-lived series G vs E. His many guest appearances include Hill Street Blues, Wiseguy, Tales from the Crypt, The X-Files, Millennium, Deadwood and House. He has also appeared in a TV commercial for IBM.

Other movie roles include Lips' Cop in the action/crime thriller Dick Tracy (1990) opposite Warren Beatty; the title role of a frightening homeless man terrorizing Bill Paxton's character in the comedy/thriller The Vagrant (1992) opposite Paxton and Michael Ironside; General Owen in the science fiction/adventure Starship Troopers (1997); the warden, Marshall Krutch, in the award-winning biopic Capote (2005) opposite Philip Seymour Hoffman; John Leshing in the family/mystery Nancy Drew (2007) opposite Emma Roberts; and Principal Rocker in the comedy Hamlet 2 (2008). Bell also played the voice acting role as Mr. Sesehund in the animated feature Heidi 4 Paws (2008).

Personal life

Bell is married to Milena Canonero, a four-time Oscar-winning costume designer, and they live in West Hollywood, California.

Filmography

References

External links

American male film actors
American male television actors
University of Colorado alumni
Male actors from Tulsa, Oklahoma
Male actors from Denver
Male actors from Los Angeles
1942 births
Living people
20th-century American male actors
21st-century American male actors
St. Paul's School (New Hampshire) alumni